Eșanu is a Romanian surname. Notable people with the surname include:

Andrei Eșanu (born 1948), Moldovan historian 
Mihai Eșanu, Romanian footballer
Nicușor Eșanu (born 1954), Romanian sprint canoer
Otilia Ruicu-Eșanu (born 1978), Romanian sprint runner

Romanian-language surnames